Paul Engle (October 12, 1908 – March 22, 1991), was an American poet, editor, teacher, literary critic, novelist, and playwright.  He is remembered as the long-time director of the Iowa Writers' Workshop and as co-founder of the International Writing Program (IWP), both at the University of Iowa.

Life
Born Paul Hamilton Engle in Cedar Rapids, Iowa, to Thomas Allen, a livery stable owner, and Evelyn (Reinheiner) Engle, Engle grew up in the Wellington Heights section of Cedar Rapids. He graduated from Washington High School (Cedar Rapids, Iowa), and later attended Coe College (class of 1931), The University of Iowa, Columbia University, and Merton College, Oxford (where he studied as a Rhodes Scholar 1933-1936).  As a student at Iowa, Engle was one of the earliest recipients of an advanced degree awarded for creative work: his first collection Worn Earth, which went on to win the Yale Series of Younger Poets.  His second book, American Song (1934), was given a rave front-page review in the New York Times Book Review and was even, briefly, a bestseller.  From 1954 to 1959, Engle served as series editor for the O. Henry Prize.

Iowa Writers' Workshop
During his tenure as director of the Iowa Writers' Workshop (1941–1965), he was responsible for bringing some of the finest writers of the day to Iowa City.  Robert Lowell, John Berryman, Robie Macauley, Kurt Vonnegut and many other prominent novelists and poets served as faculty under Engle. He increased enrollment and oversaw numerous students of future fame and influence, including Flannery O'Connor, Philip Levine, Mark Costello, Marvin Bell, Joe Nicholson, Sunil Gangopadhyay, Donald Justice, Raymond Carver, Douglas Kent Hall, Andre Dubus, and Robert Bly. During his tenure, Engle raised millions of dollars in support of the program whose shape and direction proved the model for hundreds of writing programs that have followed. One of the Workshop's enduring legacies was that it helped mainstream humanist ideals of literature and writing: that authors creating expressly political, or works with politics or messages as their text, was a betrayal of artistic integrity and that proper writing must put any such message or theme into the subtext. The most famous principles advocated were writing from self-knowledge (write what you know) and with self-discipline (show, don’t tell).

Vonnegut described Engle in a 1967 letter in this fashion: "The former head, Paul Engle, is still around, is a hayseed clown, a foxy grandpa, a terrific promoter, who, if you listen closely, talks like a man with a paper asshole."

In 1967, following his departure as director of the workshop, Engle and future second wife Nieh Hualing co-founded The University of Iowa's International Writing Program, which provided for dozens of published authors from around the world to visit Iowa City each year to write and collaborate.  Engle left the Writer's Workshop permanently in 1969 to devote himself full-time to the international program.

Death and legacy
At the time of his death (in Chicago's O'Hare Airport on his way to accept an award in Poland), Engle was the author of more than a dozen collections of poetry, a novel, a memoir, an opera libretto (for Philip Bezanson), and even a children's book. Engle wrote numerous articles and reviews for many of the largest periodicals of his day.

His papers are held at the University of Iowa and Coe College.

Works

Poetry
 Worn Earth, Yale University Press, 1932.
 American Song, Doubleday, 1934, reprinted, AMS Press, 1979.
 Break the Heart's Anger, Doubleday, 1936.
 Corn, Doubleday, 1939.
 New Englanders, Prairie Press (Muscatine, IA), 1940.
 West of Midnight, Random House, 1941.
 American Child: A Sonnet Sequence, Random House, 1945
revised and enlarged edition published as American Child: Sonnets for My Daughter, Dial, 1956.
 The Word of Love, Random House, 1951.
 Book and Child: Three Sonnets, Cummington Press (Iowa City, IA), 1956.
 Poems in Praise, Random House, 1959.
 Christmas Poems, privately printed, 1962.
 A Woman Unashamed and Other Poems, Random House, 1965.
 Embrace: Selected Love Poems''', Random House, 1969.
 Images of China: Poems Written in China, April–June, 1980, preface by Hualing Nieh, New World Press (Beijing), 1981.

Other
 Always the Land (novel), Random House, 1941.
 A Prairie Christmas (nonfiction), Longmans, Green, 1960.
 Golden Child (novel), Dutton, 1962.
 Who's Afraid?, Crowell-Collier, 1962.
 An Old-Fashioned Christmas, Dial, 1964.
 Women in the American Revolution, Follett, 1976.
 

Editor
 1954–59 Prize Stories: The O. Henry Awards, six volumes, Doubleday.
 (With Warren Carrier) Reading Modern Poetry, Scott Foresman, 1955, revised edition, 1968.
 Homage to Baudelaire, on the Centennial of "Les Fleurs du Mal," Cummington Press, 1957.
 (With Henri Coulette) Midland: Twenty-Five Years of Fiction and Poetry from the Writing Workshops of the State University of Iowa, Random House, 1961.
 (With Joseph Langland) Poet's Choice, Dial Press, 1962.
 On Creative Writing, Dutton, 1964.
 Midland II, Random House, 1970.
 (And translator with wife, Hualing Nieh) Poems of Mao Tse-Tung, Dell, 1972.
 (With Rowena Torrevillas and Hualing Nieh Engle) The World Comes to Iowa: Iowa International Anthology, Iowa State University (Ames, IA), 1987.NB: for further reference, Richard B. Weber (Library of the University of Iowa, 1966) has compiled a comprehensive bibliography entitled Paul Engle: A Checklist of books Paul Engle authored, as well as of publications he edited or to which he contributed.''

References

External links
Remembering Paul Engle in Iowa City by Robert Bly
Famous Iowans: Paul Engle (The Des Moines Register)
The Papers of Paul Engle at The University of Iowa (includes short biography)
A Community of Writers: Paul Engle and the Iowa Writers' Workshop By Robert Dana, ed.
Paul Engle Papers: George T. Henry College Archives, Coe College Cedar Rapids Iowa
Extracts from the works of Paul and Nieh Hualing Engle

1908 births
1991 deaths
20th-century American novelists
Alumni of the University of Oxford
Coe College alumni
Columbia University alumni
Iowa Writers' Workshop alumni
University of Iowa alumni
University of Iowa faculty
Yale Younger Poets winners
20th-century American poets
American male novelists
American male poets
American male short story writers
American opera librettists
20th-century American short story writers
20th-century American male writers
Novelists from Iowa
Alumni of Merton College, Oxford